Elijah Sumbeiywo was a Kenyan politician who served as a Member of Parliament for Keiyo North from 1997 to 2002.

Before joining politics he served under Moi regime as the Presidential Escort Commander.

He also served an Assistant Minister in the Office of the President and Ministry of Planning & National Development and later became Assistant Minister for Agriculture & Rural Development.

Sumbeiywo was enrolled to the Kalenjin Council of Elders in 2009.

He died in 2012 following a battle with pancreatic cancer.

References 
 

Kenyan politicians
2012 deaths
Year of birth missing